Rosenbergia dianneae is a species of beetle in the family Cerambycidae. It was described by Allard in 1990.

References

Batocerini
Beetles described in 1990